John Michael Luttig (born June 13, 1954) is an American corporate lawyer and jurist who was a United States circuit judge of the United States Court of Appeals for the Fourth Circuit from 1991 to 2006. Luttig resigned his judgeship in 2006 to become general counsel of Boeing, a position he held until 2019.

Early life and education
Luttig was born in 1954 in Tyler, Texas. He graduated from Washington and Lee University in 1976 with a Bachelor of Arts with Omicron Delta Kappa honors. From 1976 to 1978, Luttig worked for the U.S. Supreme Court's Office of the Administrative Assistant to the Chief Justice, where he developed a close friendship with Chief Justice Warren E. Burger. Luttig then attended the University of Virginia School of Law, graduating with a Juris Doctor in 1981.

Career
After law school, Luttig spent a year in the Reagan administration as an associate with the White House Counsel, Fred F. Fielding, who hired him on Burger's recommendation. Luttig's duties included reviewing potential judicial appointments and vetting them for ideological consistency with the administration's policies. From 1982 to 1983, Luttig served as a law clerk to judge (later Supreme Court justice in 1986) Antonin Scalia of the U.S. Court of Appeals for the District of Columbia Circuit, one of the potential judges he had vetted in his prior job. Luttig then clerked for Chief Justice Warren Burger of the Supreme Court of the United States from 1983 to 1984. After his Supreme Court clerkship, Luttig continued to work for Chief Justice Burger as a special assistant until 1985. Luttig later served as co-executor of Burger's one-page will, which gained notoriety for Burger's failure to dictate how estate taxes should be paid.

In 1985, Luttig entered private practice at the law firm Davis Polk & Wardwell. He returned to government service in 1989, holding various positions within the United States Department of Justice until 1991 under President George H. W. Bush, including assistant attorney general in charge of the Office of Legal Counsel. His duties in the Justice Department included assisting Supreme Court nominees David Souter and Clarence Thomas through the nomination and confirmation process, including their Senate confirmation hearings. Luttig's help to Thomas in his highly contested confirmation hearings and their aftermath was somewhat controversial because Luttig's own appointment to the federal bench had been approved by the Senate, but he delayed taking the judicial oath of office, presumably because he could not credibly serve as a federal judge, who is supposed to be nonpartisan, while fulfilling the purely political task of ensuring that Thomas got a Supreme Court seat.

Federal judgeship
On April 23, 1991, President George H. W. Bush nominated Luttig to fill a newly created seat on the United States Court of Appeals for the Fourth Circuit. He was confirmed by the United States Senate on July 26, 1991 and received his commission on August 2, 1991. He became the youngest judge (at age 37) on a federal appeals court at the time of his appointment.

On the bench, Luttig was compared to Justice Scalia for his analytical rigor and for criticizing his colleagues for inconsistencies or embellishments in their judicial opinions and right-wing extremism. He was also similar to Scalia in that his judicial philosophy sometimes led to what were seen as some anti-conservative opinions.

Luttig was mentioned frequently as being near the top of George W. Bush's list of potential nominees to the Supreme Court of the United States despite opposition from the U.S. Chamber of Commerce and a dispute between Luttig and the Bush administration over the handling of the case of alleged "dirty bomber" Jose Padilla (see below). Bush interviewed Luttig but ultimately did not choose him to fill either of two Supreme Court vacancies in 2005. Those two seats were filled by John Roberts and Samuel Alito.

Luttig was among the leading feeder judges on the U.S. court of appeals, with more than 40 of his law clerks going on to clerk with conservative justices on the Supreme Court. Of those, 33 clerked for either Justice Thomas or Justice Scalia. Luttig's clerks have nicknamed themselves "Luttigators".

Father's murder
Luttig's father, John Luttig, was fatally shot in 1994 in a carjacking by Napoleon Beazley, who at the time of the crime was a seventeen-year-old minor. Luttig testified in the sentencing portion of the trial, supporting imposition of the death penalty. Beazley was convicted, condemned to death, and eventually executed after twice appealing to the Supreme Court. Justices Antonin Scalia, David Souter, and Clarence Thomas recused themselves because of past association with Luttig. Scalia recused himself because Luttig had clerked for him; Souter and Thomas recused themselves because Luttig led the George H. W. Bush Administration's efforts to win their Senate confirmation.

Cases

Padilla v. Hanft
In September 2005, Luttig wrote the opinion for a three-judge panel of the Fourth Circuit that upheld the government's power to designate José Padilla, the alleged "dirty bomber" who was captured at a Chicago airport, as an "enemy combatant" and to detain him in a military brig without charge. In December, the Bush administration, anticipating a reversal in the Supreme Court, petitioned the Fourth Circuit for approval to transfer Padilla to civilian custody for a criminal trial. The move set off a dispute between the Bush administration and Luttig. Luttig's panel refused to grant the transfer and castigated the government for potentially harming its "credibility before the courts." The government petitioned the Supreme Court to allow the transfer by arguing that the appellate court's refusal encroached on the power of the President. The Supreme Court granted the government's request.

Hamdi v. Rumsfeld
In the case of Hamdi v. Rumsfeld, Luttig disagreed with the majority opinion of his colleagues on the Fourth Circuit and argued that Yaser Esam Hamdi, an American citizen captured in Afghanistan and held as an enemy combatant, deserved "meaningful judicial review" of his case. The Supreme Court eventually reversed the Fourth Circuit's judgment.

Resignation and corporate legal career
On May 10, 2006, Luttig resigned his federal judgeship to become general counsel and senior vice president for the American airplane manufacturer Boeing. He replaced Douglas Bain. In his resignation letter, Luttig wrote, "Boeing may well be the only company in America for which I would have ever considered leaving the court." He also mentioned his two children's upcoming college education; the position at Boeing promised more pay than the federal judgeship. At the time of his resignation, federal appellate judges were paid $175,100 annually. According to Boeing's 2008 Annual Report, Luttig's total compensation for 2008 was $2,798,962. In 2015, Luttig was named the 7th highest paid general counsel in the United States by Above the Law with a salary of $4,236,580. Luttig resigned as general counsel to Boeing in May 2019. He was replaced by Brett Gerry. Luttig's resignation coincided with the terminations of former CEO Dennis Muillenberg and former Commercial Aircraft Executive Kevin McCallister that year, during the Boeing 737 MAX groundings crisis. In January of 2021, he was hired by Coca-Cola Company to be counselor and senior advisor for tax matters.

Role in aftermath of 2020 presidential election
On January 5, 2021, John Eastman, an attorney representing president Donald Trump, and who had clerked for Luttig, met with vice president Mike Pence in the Oval Office to argue that the vice president had the constitutional authority to alter or otherwise change certified electoral votes for the presidential certification in Congress the next day. According to Eastman, he told the vice president that he might have the authority to reject electoral college votes, and he asked the vice president to delay the certification, a proposal which came to be known as the Pence Card. Pence rejected Eastman's argument and instead agreed with Luttig and another conservative scholar, John Yoo, that a vice president has no such constitutional authority. Pence released a letter on January 6 stating he would not attempt to intervene in the certification process, citing Luttig by name, who later said it was "the highest honor of my life" to be involved in preserving the Constitution.

On June 16, 2022, Luttig testified during a televised hearing conducted by the United States House Select Committee on the January 6 Attack. Before the hearing, Luttig wrote a statement for the record, stating that Trump and his allies "instigated" a war on democracy "so that he could cling to power." He continued, "It is breathtaking that these arguments even were conceived, let alone entertained by the President of the United States at that perilous moment in history" and that January 6 "was the final fateful day for the execution of a well-developed plan by the former president to overturn the 2020 presidential election at any cost."  At the close of the hearing, Luttig said:

Luttig co-authored a 69-page report refuting 2020 election-fraud claims published in July 2022.

See also
List of law clerks of the Supreme Court of the United States (Chief Justice)
George W. Bush Supreme Court candidates

References

External links

Luttig's resignation letter from Fourth Circuit Court of Appeals
 Opinion: The Republican blueprint to steal the 2024 election — April 27, 2022 
The Frontline Interview: J. Michael Luttig — May 25, 2022

1954 births
20th-century American judges
Boeing people
Federalist Society members
Judges of the United States Court of Appeals for the Fourth Circuit
Law clerks of the Supreme Court of the United States
Lawyers from Washington, D.C.
Living people
Never Trump movement
Texas lawyers
Texas Republicans
United States Assistant Attorneys General for the Office of Legal Counsel
United States court of appeals judges appointed by George H. W. Bush
University of Virginia School of Law alumni
Washington and Lee University alumni
Davis Polk & Wardwell lawyers